ATP-binding cassette sub-family D member 3 is a protein that in humans is encoded by the ABCD3 gene.

Function 

The protein encoded by this gene is a member of the superfamily of ATP-binding cassette (ABC) transporters. ABC proteins transport various molecules across extra- and intra-cellular membranes. ABC genes are divided into seven distinct subfamilies (ABC1, MDR/TAP, MRP, ALD, OABP, GCN20, White). This protein is a member of the ALD subfamily, which is involved in peroxisomal import of fatty acids and/or fatty acyl-CoAs in the organelle. All known peroxisomal ABC transporters are half transporters which require a partner half transporter molecule to form a functional homodimeric or heterodimeric transporter. This peroxisomal membrane protein likely plays an important role in peroxisome biogenesis.

Clinical significance 

Mutations have been associated with some forms of Zellweger syndrome, a heterogeneous group of peroxisome assembly disorders. However, this association was denied  and congenital bile acid synthesis defect-5 (CBAS5) was recently shown to be caused by homozygous mutation in the ABCD3 gene

See also 
 ATP-binding cassette transporter

Interactions 

ABCD3 has been shown to interact with PEX19.

References

Further reading

External links 
 
ABCD3 at The GDB Human Genome Database
 

ATP-binding cassette transporters